Freshers may mean:

 Freshers (British TV series)
 Freshers (Indian TV series)